Pierre Nihant (5 April 1925 – 12 January 1993) was a Belgian cyclist. He was born in Trembleur (part of Blegny), in the Province of Liège. He won a silver medal in the 1000m time trial at the 1948 Summer Olympics in London.

References

External links
 
 
 

1925 births
1993 deaths
People from Blegny
Belgian male cyclists
Cyclists at the 1948 Summer Olympics
Olympic cyclists of Belgium
Olympic silver medalists for Belgium
Olympic medalists in cycling
Medalists at the 1948 Summer Olympics
Cyclists from Liège Province
20th-century Belgian people